Moriarty Air Force Station (ADC ID: P-51) is a closed United States Air Force General Surveillance Radar station. It was closed in 1961.

History
In late 1951 Air Defense Command selected this mountainous site near Moriarty, New Mexico as one of twenty-eight radar stations built as part of the second segment of the permanent radar surveillance network. Prompted by the start of the Korean War, on July 11, 1950, the Secretary of the Air Force asked the Secretary of Defense for approval to expedite construction of the second segment of the permanent network. Receiving the Defense Secretary's approval on July 21, the Air Force directed the Corps of Engineers to proceed with construction.

On 1 January 1951 the 768th Aircraft Control and Warning Squadron was activated at Moriarty Air Force Station by the 540th Aircraft Control and Warning Group, and initially the station functioned as a Ground-Control Intercept (GCI) and warning station.  As a GCI station, the squadron's role was to guide interceptor aircraft toward unidentified intruders picked up on the unit's radar scopes.    The station consisted of 54 buildings; 1 office building, 5 storage buildings, 5 barracks, 19 family housing units and 24 other buildings.   The station had a branch of the Kirtland AFB BX, a theater, several service clubs, a library, swimming pool and tennis court.  A housing area was built for married personnel.

Initially operating an AN/CPS-5 radar, by September 1952 the 768th AC&W Squadron operated AN/FPS-3 and AN/FPS-5 radars from the station. Six years later an AN/FPS-20 radar replaced the AN/FPS-3 search radar, and an AN/FPS-6 performed height-finding duties.

In 1960 Moriarty Air Force Station was transferred to the Federal Aviation Administration pending inactivation of the 768th, which was discontinued on 1 June 1961.  The facility was turned over to the General Services Administration for disposal in 1962 and was turned over to the State of New Mexico and several private owners.

Today what was the station is abandoned, and owned by the State of New Mexico.  The remaining buildings are overgrown with vegetation and unused.  It is used by the State Highway and Transportation Department for material storage and solid waste disposal. It contains misc equipment such as concrete barriers, old signs, etc. but no indications that they visit the grounds frequently.  The remainder of the former station is used for livestock grazing.

The remains of Moriarty Air Force Station consist of six buildings still standing on the site.  The buildings are gutted and in a decrepit state due to neglect and vandalism. All other buildings have been torn down.  The streets remain on the site in very poor repair.

Air Force units and assignments 
Units:
 768th Aircraft Control and Warning Squadron, Activated 1 January 1951 at Moriarty Air Force Station
 Inactivated on 1 June 1986

Assignments:
 540th Aircraft Control and Warning Group, 1 January 1951
 34th Air Division, 1 May 1951
 Albuquerque Air Defense Sector, 1 January 1960
 Oklahoma City Air Defense Sector, 15 September 1960 – 1 June 1961

See also
 United States general surveillance radar stations

References

  A Handbook of Aerospace Defense Organization  1946–1980,  by Lloyd H. Cornett and Mildred W. Johnson, Office of History, Aerospace Defense Center, Peterson Air Force Base, Colorado
 Winkler, David F. (1997), Searching the skies: the legacy of the United States Cold War defense radar program. Prepared for United States Air Force Headquarters Air Combat Command.
 Information for Moriarty AFS, NM

External links

Installations of the United States Air Force in New Mexico
Radar stations of the United States Air Force
Aerospace Defense Command military installations
Military installations closed in 1961
1951 establishments in New Mexico
Military installations established in 1951
1961 disestablishments in New Mexico